The Uganda Electricity Distribution Company Limited (UEDCL) is a parastatal company whose primary purpose is to distribute electric power to domestic and commercial end-users in Uganda, at and below 33 kiloVolts. This role was sub-leased to Umeme for a 20-year concession that ends in 2025.

Location
The headquarters of UEDCL are on the sixth floor of UEDCL Towers, 37 Nakasero Road, Nakasero Hill, in Kampala, Uganda's capital and largest city. The coordinates of the company headquarters are 0°19'35.0"N, 32°34'38.0"E (Latitude:0.326390; Longitude:32.577222).

History
UEDCL was established in 2001 by an act of the Ugandan parliament following the break-up of the Uganda Electricity Board. In 2005, Umeme took over the majority of assets and responsibilities of UEDCL for a period of 20 years on a concessionary basis.

In 2018, the Natural Resources Committee of the Ugandan Parliament weighed the benefits and consequences of terminating that concession earlier than 2025. The committee was informed by Joseph Katera, the UEDCL managing director, that the government needed to invest at least US$100 million on an annual basis, to maintain on-going operations. Another US$330 million break-up fee would be due to Umeme at the time of premature termination.

Operations

Governance
UEDCL is governed by a seven-person board of directors whose chairman is Francis Tumuheirwe. Other members of the board of directors include James Banabe Isingoma, Dr May Ssengendo, Habib Zaitun, Kalanguka Kayondho, Godfrey Turyahikayo & Christopher Mugisha. The Company's managing director is Paul Mwesigwa.

Developments
In February 2021, Ugandan online media reported that the Electricity Regulatory Authority of Uganda had cancelled the electricity distribution license of Bundibugyo Energy Cooperative Society (BECS), which had been responsible for energy distribution in Bundibugyo District. That license was immediately transferred to UEDCL. The affected distribution area includes Ntoroko District and parts of Kabarole District.

See also

Electricity Regulatory Authority
Energy in Uganda

References

External links
 UEDCL Homepage
 Electricity Firms Face Staffing Challenges As of 8 September 2015.

Energy companies of Uganda
Electric power infrastructure in Uganda
Electric power companies of Uganda
Energy companies established in 2001
Electric power distribution network operators
Government-owned companies of Uganda
2001 establishments in Uganda